Hjálmar Jónsson may refer to:

 Hjálmar Jónsson (1796–1875), poet a.k.a. Bólu-Hjálmar 
 Hjálmar Jónsson (footballer) (born 1980)
 Rev. Hjálmar Jónsson (priest), pastor of the parish of Reykjavík Cathedral and former member of the Alþingi

See also:
 Hjalmar Johansson (1874–1957), Swedish swimmer

fr:Hjálmar Jónsson